Air Putih is a state constituency in Penang, Malaysia, that has been represented in the Penang State Legislative Assembly since 2004. It covers the northern part of Air Itam, a suburb of George Town that is located in the central part of Penang Island.

The state constituency was first contested in 2004 and is mandated to return a single Assemblyman to the Penang State Legislative Assembly under the first-past-the-post voting system. , the State Assemblyman for Air Putih is Lim Guan Eng from the Democratic Action Party (DAP), which is part of the state's ruling coalition, Pakatan Harapan (PH). Lim was also the Chief Minister of Penang between 2008 and 2018.

Definition 
The Air Putih constituency contains the polling districts of Bukit Bendera (Penang Hill), Hye Keat Estate, Jalan Lintang, Race Course, Reservoir Gardens, Stesen Bawah (referring to the Penang Hill Railway Lower Station) and Taman Sempadan.

Polling districts 
According to the federal gazette issued on 30 March 2018, the Air Putih constituency is divided into 7 polling districts.

Aside from the northern part of the Air Itam suburb, colloquially known as Air Putih by the locals, much of the state seat is sparsely populated, consisting of hilly and forested areas that include the Penang Hill.

The Air Putih seat is bounded to the southeast by Air Itam Road; the portion of Air Itam south of the road falls under the Air Itam constituency. This constituency also stretches up to the residential areas of Air Itam south of the Rifle Range neighbourhood, with Rifle Range coming under the neighbouring Kebun Bunga seat.

Demographics

History

Election results 
The electoral results for the Air Putih state constituency in 2004, 2008, 2013 and 2018 are as follows.

See also 
 Constituencies of Penang

References 
 

Penang state constituencies